The Province of Montreal is a proposal to separate the city of Montreal, its metropolitan region or its English and non-Francophone regions into a separate province from Quebec, becoming the 11th province of Canada. There have been several proposals of this nature from the mid-20th century onwards.

During the French colonial era, a district of Montreal existed in the French Province of Canada. During the 19th century, Americans sometimes referred to the Province of Quebec as the Province of Montreal. The Roman Catholic Church also divides Canada up into ecclesiastical provinces, one of which is the Ecclesiastical Province of Montreal.

During the prelude to Canadian Confederation in the 1860s, some proposals were made to divide up Lower Canada, the current Province of Quebec, into multiple provinces, the one with the most currency being to create the Provinces of Montreal, Eastern Townships, and Quebec.

One of the earlier modern proposals for the Province of Montreal dates from the late 1960s, when it was proposed that Mr. Montreal, Mayor Jean Drapeau, having many successes and having the city as the economic engine of the Province of Quebec, become the premier of a new province because of how Montreal tax dollars were spent outside the region with little benefit to Montrealers.

After the renewed rise of the Quebec sovereignty movement in the 1990s, efforts revived to create a Province of Montreal. Roopnarine Singh of Montreal founded the Movement for the 11th Province of Montreal in that era. The era before and after the 1995 referendum also produced proposals to split the western Ottawa Valley region, the Eastern Townships of Quebec along the US border, and English-speaking parts of Montreal (such as the West Island and Westmount) into a Province of Montreal. The proposal was made by the partitionist movement, which demands the right for minorities to secede from Quebec if Quebec secedes from Canada. In the wake of the referendum, prominent lawyer and then-federalist Guy Bertrand led a court fight to allow for the creation of the Province of Montreal if Quebec were to secede. West Virginia was used as an example to support the position in public.

See also 
 Proposal for the Province of Toronto

References

Politics of Montreal
Montreal